Bownomomys was an early marmoset-like primate that lived in North America during the Early Eocene epoch, about 56-50 million years ago.

Taxonomy
Teilhardina americana and T. crassidens were originally named as species of Teilhardina, usually considered a member of Omomyidae. However, phylogenetic analysis by Ni et al. (2004) recovered Teilhardina as polyphyletic, with Teilhardina belgica and T. asiatica nested as the basalmost haplorrhines, and T. americana and T. crassidens being recovered as anaptomorphine omomyids (and thus more closely related to the tarsiers than to simians). Teilhardina crassidens was later referred to the genus Baataromomys by Ni et al. (2007). A paper by Morse et al. built upon the cladistic results of Ni et al. (2004) by recognizing T. americana and T. crassidens as belonging to a new genus, which they named Bownomomys.

References

Prehistoric primate genera
Eocene primates
Cenozoic mammals of North America
Fossil taxa described in 2018